HD 36848 (HR 1877) is a star in the southern constellation Columba. It has an apparent magnitude of 5.46, allowing it to be faintly seen with a naked eye. The star is relatively close at a distance of  174 light years and is moving closer with a heliocentric radial velocity of only .

HD 36848 has a stellar classification of K2/3 III — intermediate between a K2 and 3 giant star. It is on the red giant branch, meaning it has exhausted its core hydrogen and is now fusing hydrogen in a shell outside the core. It has a comparable mass to the Sun but has expanded to 8.71 times the radius of the Sun after 7.33 billion years.

The star's multiplicity status isn't generally agreed on. Eggleton et al. classifies it as a solitary star while De Mederios et al. finds it to be a probable spectroscopic binary.

References

K-type giants
036848
025993
CD-38 2085
1877
Columba (constellation)
Columbae, 24